Inga Jankauskaitė (born 10 January 1981) is a Lithuanian actress, singer, and piano player.

Career 
Jankauskaitė was as a radio DJ at radio stations Kauno fonas and Ultra vires. After graduation from the Juozas Naujalis Music Academy in 1997, she studied at the Lithuanian Academy of Music and Theatre from 1999 to 2002 and 2004 to 2005.

She was a member of music group L+. In 2007, she participated in TV reality show Žvaigždžių duetai and won the second place with her partner Česlovas Gabalis. In a satirical news show Dviračio šou she plays a "blond girl". Presently Jankauskaitė is also a coach on TV show The Voice of Lithuania and presenter on TV show Žvaigždžių duetai (Star Duos).

Roles of note 
Theatre
2001 – Berta in King Kongo dukterys by Theresie Walser, Naujosios dramos akcija
2004 – Marija Stiuart in Marija Stiuart by Friedrich von Schiller, Lithuanian National Drama Theatre
2005 – Liza in Demonai. Nelabieji. Apsėstieji. Kipšai. by Fyodor Dostoyevsky, Lithuanian National Drama Theatre
2006 – Rožė in Mažasis princas by Antoine de Saint Exupéry, Lithuanian National Drama Theatre
2007 – Juliet in Meilė ir mirtis Veronoje
2008 – Odrė in Vilnius - Dakaras

Cinema
2004 – Pušelė in Vienui vieni
2010 – in Zero2 (nominated for Sidabrinė gervė)
2013 – Kaip pavogti žmoną
2017 – Zero3
2017 – Trys Milijonai
2019 – Ir visi jų vyrai

TV
2007–2008 – Mėta in Nekviesta meilė
2017–2018 - Lietuvos Balsas Judge/Coach
2019 - Lietuvos balsas. Senjorai Judge/Coach

References

1981 births
Living people
21st-century Lithuanian women singers
Lithuanian film actresses
Lithuanian stage actresses
Lithuanian television presenters
Lithuanian Academy of Music and Theatre alumni
21st-century Lithuanian actresses
Place of birth missing (living people)
Lithuanian women television presenters